This is a list of fiction set in Pittsburgh, Pennsylvania.

Books
Afterimage by Kathleen George
An American Childhood by Annie Dillard
American Rust by Philipp Meyer
Another Kind of Monday by William Coles
The Autobiography of My Body by David Guy
Blood on the Forge by William Attaway
The Book of Jonas by Stephen Dau
Burning Valley by Philip Bonosky
Captains and Kings by Taylor Caldwell
Christine by Stephen King
Disquiet Heart by Randall Silvis
Duffy's Rocks by Edward Fenton
East Pittsburgh Downlow by Dave Newman
Elfhome (series) by Wen Spencer
Fallen by Kathleen George
Greenhorn on the Frontier by Ann Finlayson
Ghosts of the Golden Triangle by Mord McGhee
The Homewood Books by John Edgar Wideman
Iron City by Lloyd L. Brown
The Last Chicken in America by Ellen Litman
The King's Orchard by Agnes Sligh Turnbull (1963) The Leap Year Boy by Marc Simon (2013) Lethal Legacy by Gerald MyersA Little Girl in Old PittsburgLooking For The General by Warren MillerThe Man Who Liked Slow Tomatoes by K.C. ConstantineThe Memory Keeper's DaughterA Model World and Other Stories by Michael ChabonMonongahela Dusk by John HoerrThe Mysteries of Pittsburgh by Michael ChabonOut of This Furnace by Thomas BellThe Perks of Being a Wallflower by Stephen ChboskyRemember the End by Agnes Sligh Turnbull (1938)
Riot by William Trautmann
 Seducing Mr. Darcy by Gwyn Cready (2008)
Sent for You Yesterday by John Edgar Wideman
Settling Accounts: Drive to the East
Taken by Kathleen George
The Tempering by Gloria Skurzynski
Three Golden Rivers by Olive Price
The Two Georges
 U.S.A. by John dos Passos
Ukiah Oregon series
Watch Your Mouth by Daniel Handler
Wonder Boys by Michael Chabon
Ornamental Graces by Carolyn Astfalk
All in Good Time by Carolyn Astfalk
She Gets the Girl by Rachael Lippincott and Alyson Derrick

Comic books
Firestorm the Nuclear Man
The Pitt
Star Brand

Film

Plays
The Pittsburgh Cycle - In 2005, August Wilson completed a ten-play cycle, nine of which are set in Pittsburgh, chronicling the African-American experience in the 20th century.  These are:
1900s - Gem of the Ocean (2003)
1910s - Joe Turner's Come and Gone (1984)
1920s - Ma Rainey's Black Bottom (1982) - set in Chicago
1930s - The Piano Lesson (1986) - Pulitzer Prize
1940s - Seven Guitars (1995)
1950s - Fences (1985) - Pulitzer Prize
1960s - Two Trains Running (1990)
1970s - Jitney (1982)
1980s - King Hedley II (2001)
1990s - Radio Golf (2005)

Television shows

Movies

Music
 "America", written by Paul Simon and performed by Simon & Garfunkel, includes the line "Kathy", I said, / As we boarded a Greyhound in Pittsburgh, / Michigan seems like a dream to me now."
 "Duquesne Whistle," which appears on the Bob Dylan album Tempest, was co-written by Dylan and Robert Hunter.  The song describes a train ride through Pittsburgh. NPR's Ann Powers speculates that this may be the same train described in Dylan's "Lo and Behold".
 "A Good Man Is Hard to Find" by Bruce Springsteen describes "It's cloudy out in Pittsburgh / It's raining in Saigon / Snow's falling across the Michigan line."
 "I'm Not Dead (I'm in Pittsburgh)", which appears on the Frank Black album Fast Man Raider Man, was co-written by Black and Pittsburgher Reid Paley.  It draws upon Pittsburgh's historical connection with the zombie genre.
"I finally found a place to call my own / a place where all good sinners can get stoned / I'll keep my holy vision, you keep your stupid pride / You said I couldn't make it on my own / But I'm not dead (I'm in Pittsburgh) / And now I can't get out of town / But I'm not dead (I'm in Pittsburgh) / They've got me all strung, come cut me down."
 "Life During Wartime," which appears on the Talking Heads' Fear of Music and Stop Making Sense, asks the listener in a post-apocalyptic landscape, "Heard about Houston? Heard about Detroit? Heard about Pittsburgh, PA?"  Long-time Talking Heads drummer Chris Frantz grew up in Pittsburgh.
 "Lo and Behold," which appears on The Basement Tapes by Bob Dylan and the Band, tells the story of the narrator recounting a train ride with "I come into Pittsburgh / At six-thirty flat / I found myself a vacant seat / An' I put down my hat."
"Sweet Little Sixteen", by Chuck Berry, rhymes "Pittsburgh, P.A." with "Frisco Bay."
 "Six Days on the Road", written by Earl Green and Carl Montgomery, describes a trucker who says "Well, I pulled out of Pittsburgh", in describing life on the road.
 Pittsburgher Wiz Khalifa often mentions the city in his music.
Pittsburgher Mac Miller often mentions his hometown in his music

Video games
Fallout 3
The Last of Us

References

Pittsburgh-related lists